Charia is a village in the municipal unit of Oleni, Elis, Greece. It is situated in a valley between low hills, at 80 m elevation. It is 2 km west of Karatoula, 4 km east of Ampelonas, and 9 km northeast of Pyrgos.

See also
List of settlements in Elis

References

External links
 Charia GTP Travel Pages

Populated places in Elis